Álvaro Ribeiro (16 May 1901 – 11 November 1979) was a Brazilian sprinter. He competed in the men's 100 metres and the 200 metres events at the 1924 Summer Olympics.

References

External links
 

1901 births
1979 deaths
Athletes (track and field) at the 1924 Summer Olympics
Brazilian male sprinters
Olympic athletes of Brazil
20th-century Brazilian people